The East 143rd Street–St. Mary's Street station is a local station on the IRT Pelham Line of the New York City Subway. It is served by the 6 train at all times, and is located at the intersection of East 143rd Street (also known as St. Mary's Street) and Southern Boulevard in the Bronx. The station opened in 1919 as part of an extension of the Pelham Line of the Interborough Rapid Transit Company, and had its platforms extended in the 1960s.

History 
This station opened on January 7, 1919, as part of an extension of the Pelham Line from Third Avenue–138th Street to Hunts Point Avenue by the Interborough Rapid Transit Company (IRT).

Both platforms were extended at the east (railroad north) end in the 1960s to accommodate the current standard length of an IRT train. The extensions are noticeable as they are narrower than the rest of the platforms, have no columns, and the trim line is blue with "E 143RD ST" in white sans serif font. They also resulted in the platforms being slightly offset.

Station layout

This underground station has three tracks and two side platforms. The center express track is used by the weekday peak direction <6> service.

Both platforms have their original Dual Contracts mosaic trim line and name tablets. "143" tablets for "East 143rd Street" run along the trim line at regular intervals and the name tablets have "E. 143RD STREET" in all-caps, serif lettering. Dark blue i-beam columns run along the platforms at regular intervals with every other one having the standard black name plate with white lettering.

There are no crossovers or crossunders to allow free transfers between directions. There is a closed newsstand that has been tiled over.

By passenger count, it is both the least-used station in the Bronx and the least-used IRT station citywide.

Exits
Both platforms have one same-level fare control area at the south (geographical west) end. Each one has a turnstile bank, token booth, and two street stairs. The ones on the Pelham Bay Park-bound platform go up to the either southern corners of the T-intersection of Southern Boulevard and East 143rd Street while the ones on the Manhattan-bound platform go up to either northern corners.

References

External links 

 
 Station Reporter — 6 Train
 The Subway Nut — East 143rd Street–St. Mary's Street Pictures
 East 143rd Street / St. Mary's Street entrance from Google Maps Street View
 Platforms from Google Maps Street View

143
New York City Subway stations in the Bronx
Railway stations in the United States opened in 1919